Steven P. Doyle (born May 21, 1958) is an American lawyer and Democratic politician from La Crosse County, Wisconsin.  He is a member of the Wisconsin State Assembly, representing the 94th Assembly district since May 2011.  The 94th Assembly district covers most of La Crosse County outside of the city of La Crosse. He also serves on the La Crosse County board of supervisors, and was chairman from 2002 through 2011.

Background and personal life
Born in La Crosse, Doyle graduated from Aquinas High School in 1976. Doyle then went on to graduate from University of Wisconsin–La Crosse in 1980 and received his Juris Doctor degree from University of Wisconsin Law School in 1986. He practices law in La Crosse, and taught local and state government and the American legal system at the University of Wisconsin-La Crosse.

As of April 2017, he has been married to his wife, Gloria, for 30 years, and they have two daughters, Katelyn and Stephanie.

Doyle and his family live in Onalaska, Wisconsin, where they raise alpacas.

Elected office
In 1984, Doyle ran for the 94th Wisconsin State Assembly district (rural and suburban La Crosse County) to succeed fellow Democrat Virgil Roberts (who had represented what had been the 35th Assembly District before redistricting). He won the primary election with a plurality, but lost in the general election, with 10,190 to 10,959 for Republican Sylvester G. Clements. 
 
He was first elected to the La Crosse Count Board of Supervisors in 1986 and served as chair from 2002 - 2011. He has continued to serve on the county board throughout his terms in the Assembly. 

On May 3, 2011, Doyle was elected to the Assembly in a special election to replace Republican Michael Huebsch. Doyle defeated John Lautz 54% to 46%.  He has been re-elected six times and, most recently, defeated Michael Huebsch's son, Ryan, in the 2022 general election.

Electoral history

Wisconsin Assembly (2011–present)

References

External links
Rep. Steve Doyle's Homepage official government website
Doyle for Assembly official campaign website

1958 births
Living people
County supervisors in Wisconsin
Politicians from La Crosse, Wisconsin
University of Wisconsin–La Crosse faculty
University of Wisconsin–La Crosse alumni
University of Wisconsin Law School alumni
Wisconsin lawyers
21st-century American politicians
People from Onalaska, Wisconsin
Aquinas High School (La Crosse, Wisconsin) alumni
Democratic Party members of the Wisconsin State Assembly